is a town in Fukushima Prefecture, Japan. ,  the town had an estimated population of 12917 in 5414 households, and a population density of 110 persons per km2.

Kawamata is known for its production of silk and silk products. In the late 6th century, Ōtomo no Koteko, also known as Otehime, came to this area. According to tradition, she is honored for having encouraged silk farming in the area.  The town is also known for the raising of shamo, a special breed of game bird similar to chicken. Shamo ramen is a local speciality.

Kawamata's main annual event is the Cosquín en Japón festival, a three-day celebration of  traditional Argentinian music and dance, which is held each year in October.

Geography
The geographic area of Kawamata is approximately 10 km east-to-west and 20 km north-to-south; the total land area is 127.66 km2. It has an altitude of 201.2 m as measured at the site of the municipal office. Kawamata is located at the confluence of two local rivers, the Hirose and the Isazawa, from which the town's name (meaning "river fork") is derived. Several other small rivers and streams run through the town.

There are four designated mountains in Kawamata: Mt. Kōdaishi (863 m), Mt. Hakubaishi (821 m), Mt. Kuchibuto (842 m), and Mt. Hanazuka (918 m).

Surrounding municipalities

 Fukushima Prefecture
 Fukushima
 Date
 Nihonmatsu
 Iitate 
 Namie

Subdivisions
The central town consists of the Kawamata neighborhood and parts of Tsuruzawa, Kogami, and Iizaka.  The remaining areas are outlying neighborhoods:
 (Central) Kawamata
 Tsuruzawa
 Kogami
 Iizaka
 Ōtsunagi
 Kotsunagi
 Higashi-Fukuzawa
 Nishi-Fukuzawa
 Ojima
 Akiyama (also called Fukuda)
 Yamakiya

Yamakiya
It is located in the mountains to the south-east of the central town; at 37.40 km2, it occupies almost one third of Kawamata's geographic area. Within Kawamata, Yamakiya retains some of its own distinct cultural characteristics. Yamakiya is home to the Yamakiya Taiko Club, an amateur taiko drum performance group made up of young people from the community. In April 2012, several members of the club travelled to Washington, DC in the US for the 100th anniversary of the National Cherry Blossom Festival as part of a cultural exchange initiative.

One of Yamakiya's prominent facilities is the Yamakiya Skating Rink, an outdoor ice rink which is normally open during January and early February. Speed skating competitions are held for local school children every year.

The Yamakiya region was placed under mandatory evacuation (classified as a "planned evacuation zone") due to elevated levels of radiation following the 2011 earthquake and nuclear crisis. As of 10 August 2013, the evacuation status of Yamakiya was reorganized, with the majority of the area being redesignated as "an area readying for the lifting of evacuation orders", and a small area by the Namie border to remain restricted. The actual evacuation status may be lifted in spring of 2016.

Climate
Kawamata has a humid climate (Köppen climate classification Cfa).

Demographics
Per Japanese census data, like many rural Japanese communities, Kawamata has suffered from a shrinking population over the past few decades. From a high of more than 27,000 in 1950, the population has decreased to only 15,010 in 2012. This has been correlated with a reduction in available services, including the shutting down of the Kawamata Line railway in 1972, and the closing or merging of several schools.

History
The area of present-day Kawamata was part of ancient Mutsu Province. Numerous Jōmon period ruins have been found in the area. During the Edo period, it was tenryō territory under direct control of the Tokugawa shogunate. After the Meiji Restoration, it was organized as part of Adachi District in the Nakadōri region of Iwaki Province with the creation of the modern municipalities system.

The origin of modern Kawamata goes back to 1876, when Kawamata Village was established; the community was subsequently redesignated as Kawamata Town with the establishment of the municipalities system on 1 April 1889. In 1955, seven neighboring villages – Fukuda, Iizaka, Kotsunagi, Ōtsunagi, Ojima, Tomita, and Yamakiya – were merged into Kawamata Town, leading to the current municipal boundaries.

Kawamata's official emblem, a stylized か (ka) hiragana designed to resemble a bird in flight, was adopted in 1965.

2011 Earthquake and Fukushima nuclear disaster
Kawamata was impacted in a number of ways by the March 2011 Tōhoku earthquake and tsunami. As an inland community, the town was not directly affected by the tsunami. However, power outages lasting up to several days (depending on area) occurred. Several buildings, including the municipal office building, suffered significant structural damage and were subsequently evacuated.

The Fukushima Daiichi nuclear disaster at the Fukushima I Nuclear Power Plant initially led to the establishment of a 30 km exclusion zone around the power station.  Although Kawamata was located outside this region, in April 2011, the Japanese government established additional evacuation areas which included the Yamakiya neighborhood of Kawamata. The evacuation order will be lifted on 31 March 2017. Controls had been relaxed in August 2013 permitting decontamination work to start.

Economy
The traditional industries of Kawamata were historically agriculture and textiles. Rice farming, shamo chicken, and silk goods all remain culturally important. In recent years, the manufacturing of products such as automobile parts has also become prominent.

Education
As of 2012, Kawamata had six public elementary schools and two junior high schools operated by the town government. The town also operates five half-day kindergartens, and one full-day nursery school. The is one public high school operated by the Fukushima Prefectural Board of Education. Since 2011 a number of schools (kindergarten through junior high school) from neighbouring Iitate village have been housed inside temporary facilities in Kawamata.

Kindergartens and nursery schools
 
 
 
 
  (currently sharing facilities with Kawamata-Minami Kindergarten)

Elementary schools
 
 
 
 
 
  (currently housed inside Kawamata-Minami Elementary School)

Kawamata-Minami Elementary School was founded in 1985 from the merger of two former schools: Ōtsunagi Elementary School and Kotsunagi Elementary School.  Similarly, Tomita Elementary School was founded in 1989 from the merger of Tsuruzawa and Kogami Elementary Schools.

Students from these two schools were moved into Kawamata Elementary School.

Following the March 2011 earthquake and tsunami, the former Ojima Elementary School building, now a community centre, was temporarily used to house evacuees from several other municipalities close to the damaged Fukushima I nuclear power station.

Junior high schools
 
  (currently housed inside Kawamata Junior High School)

Originally, various districts of Kawamata had their own junior high schools. In 1974, all except Yamakiya Junior High School were merged into Kawamata Junior High School.

High schools
 is located in the Iizaka district of Kawamata; like all public senior high schools in Japan, it is operated by the prefectural government rather than by the municipality.

Transportation

Railway
Kawamata is not served by any passenger train lines. The nearest railway station is Matsukawa Station on the Tōhoku Main Line.  Kawamata itself has had no railway service since 1972, when the former Kawamata Line from Matsukawa, operated by Japanese National Railways (JNR), was abolished.

Highways

 

Bus access is available to and from various surrounding municipalities. In particular, the East Japan Railway Company (JR East) operates buses between Kawamata and Fukushima City.

Local attractions

Events
Kawamata holds various annual events throughout the year. These include:

 Kawamata Road Race (June)
 Karariko Festa (August) – a street festival to mark Obon, with dancing, fireworks, and live performances
 Shamo Matsuri (August) – a two-day exhibition celebrating the local shamo industry
 Traffic Safety Marching Band Parade (September)
 Cosquín en Japón (October) – a three-day Argentinian music festival and concert, featuring performers from around Japan and the world
 Kasuga Shrine Festival (October) – two-day autumn street festival
 Silk Fair (October) – a two-day open market for silk and other local products

References

External links

 

 
Towns in Fukushima Prefecture